Alex Bruno Costa Fernandes (born 9 May 1982 in São Paulo) is a Brazilian footballer who currently plays for Independente de Limeira as a centre back.

Honours
Santo André
 Brazilian Cup: 2004

São Paulo
 São Paulo State League: 2005
 Copa Libertadores: 2005
 FIFA Club World Cup: 2005
 Brazilian Série A: 2006

Botafogo
 Taça Rio: 2007

References

External links
  globoesporte.globo.com
 
  canalbotafogo.com
  CBF
  Alex's homepage
 

1982 births
Living people
Brazilian footballers
Campeonato Brasileiro Série A players
Campeonato Brasileiro Série B players
Esporte Clube Santo André players
São Paulo FC players
Botafogo de Futebol e Regatas players
Associação Portuguesa de Desportos players
Clube Atlético Mineiro players
Primeira Liga players
C.D. Nacional players
Sport Club do Recife players
Paraná Clube players
Rio Claro Futebol Clube players
Brazilian expatriate footballers
Expatriate footballers in Portugal
Brazilian expatriate sportspeople in Portugal
Association football defenders
CE Operário Várzea-Grandense players
Footballers from São Paulo